Sanremo Young is a teen talent show, devoted for young singers aged between 14 and 17, which takes inspiration from Sanremo Music Festival. The show, presented by Antonella Clerici, is held in the Teatro Ariston of Sanremo and broadcast on Rai 1.

Format
The show is directed by Duccio Forzano and presented by Antonella Clerici, with the participation of various guests. The cast of young talents will be accompanied by the SanremoYoung Orchestra, entirely composed of musicians between the ages of 18 and 25, selected by Diego Basso. The choreographies are curated by Daniel Ezralow.

All the selected contestants will compete from the early evening, interpreting famous songs composed by great authors and performed by Italian and international artists. They will be judged by the Academy -a jury composed of different characters- and by the public televoting.

First season
The first season begins on February 16, 2018 and will last for five weeks.

Contestants
1,137 young singers participated in the selections, but only twelve were selected for the cast:

 Matteo Markus Bok 
 Sharon Caroccia
 Leonardo De Andreis 
 Zaira Angela Di Grazia
 Ouiam El Mrieh
 Luna Farina 
 Alessandro Franceschini 
 Elena Manuele
 Bianca Moccia
 Eleonora Pieri 
 Raffaele Renda
 Rocco Scarano

References

Italian reality television series
2018 in Italian television
2018 song contests
February 2018 events in Italy
Sanremo Music Festival by year